The Guilt of Janet Ames is a 1947 American sentimental film noir directed by Henry Levin, based on a story by Lenore Coffee, and starring Rosalind Russell and Melvyn Douglas.

Plot
War widow Janet Ames (Rosalind Russell) is stricken unconscious by an automobile. The police find no identification on her, only a list of masculine names, including that of Smitty Cobb (Melvyn Douglas), a hard-drinking newspaperman. The police contact Smitty, who is shown the list, and he realizes right away who she is. He finds her at the hospital in a wheelchair, unable to walk. The doctor, who can find no physical reason for the paralysis, has referred her to a psychiatrist.  Smitty, however, decides to treat her himself. He encourages Janet to describe each of the men on the list, though she has never seen or met them. They are actually ex-comrades of her soldier/husband. While in action in 1944 Europe, he had fallen on a grenade to save their lives.

The first survivor she visualizes is nightclub bouncer Joe Burton (Richard Benedict) and his singer/girlfriend Katie (Betsy Blair), who dream of building a house. Janet's next vision takes her to the desert, where the second veteran on the list, Ed Pierson, is doing scientific research and living in a shack with his wife Susie (Nina Foch). The third ex-soldier is Frank Merino (Hugh Beaumont), who appears with his young daughter Emmy. These three encounters remind Janet that David, her husband, had actually wanted to build a house and have a child right away, but she had dismissed both notions as too expensive and troublesome. Then, Janet, this time accompanied in the fourth vision by Smitty, attend a nightclub, where they are entertained by Sammy Weaver (Sid Caesar), the fourth survivor. He is a promising, up-and-coming comedian and after his stand-up routine concludes, he thanks her for the opportunity to lift the spirits of his audience.

Janet admits to Smitty the guilt she harbors for making David's civilian life so miserable.  Smitty, however, persuades her to forgive herself for her own selfishness. When she does, the paralysis of her legs disappears. Later, Smitty, who was her dead husband's commanding officer, reveals his own guilt in having ordered David to fall on the grenade. Janet tells Smitty that he would have done so without being ordered, and that he probably never even heard the command. She then turns the tables on her healer, Smitty, by visualizing and describing their happy future life together.

Cast

References

External links
 
 
 
 

1947 films
1947 drama films
American black-and-white films
American drama films
Columbia Pictures films
Films about paraplegics or quadriplegics
Films about widowhood
Films directed by Henry Levin
Films scored by George Duning
1940s English-language films
1940s American films